Angelo Cattaneo (13 June 1901 – 1986) was an Italian cyclist. He competed in the time trial event at the 1928 Summer Olympics.

References

External links
 

1901 births
1986 deaths
Italian male cyclists
Olympic cyclists of Italy
Cyclists at the 1928 Summer Olympics
Cyclists from Milan